Edward J. Paskey (August 20, 1939 – August 17, 2021) was an American actor. He was best known for playing Lieutenant Leslie on the television series Star Trek from 1966 to 1968.

Early life 
Paskey was born in a small farming town in Delaware but was raised in California. He moved with his family to Santa Monica in 1952. In his youth he was immersed in automobiles by working at his father's garage, and developed an interest in hot rods from a young age. His first car was a 1941 Ford coupe but was later replaced by a 1955 Ford Thunderbird that he purchased while earning $1.25 per hour.

Career 
Paskey's first credited television role was in the drama Ben Casey (1966)
after meeting series producer Irving Elman while working at a service station in Pacific Palisades. In it he was credited as "Policeman." For the next five or six years he continued to act while working at the service station on weekends. He appeared on The Dick Van Dyke Show, Mission: Impossible in the 1966 pilot episode and in the 1966 episode "The Ransom," The Lucy Show, Twelve O'Clock High, The Wild Wild West and Please Don't Eat the Daisies. He also appeared in uncredited roles in the films  What Did You Do in the War, Daddy? and Mister Buddwing.

Star Trek: The Original Series 
Paskey first appeared on Star Trek as a "crewman" on the second pilot episode "Where No Man Has Gone Before," and was first identified by name in "Mudd's Women" in an early scene where Doctor McCoy refers to him as Connors. In subsequent episodes, he was cast regularly as a crewman, but also appeared as a security officer, a helmsman, an engineer station officer, even an alien, all to create a sense of continuity on Star Trek during the series' run. Paskey had scripted lines in four episodes and was credited in two. His character, Mr. Leslie, appeared in more episodes than principal characters Sulu or Chekov. William Shatner gave the character the name Leslie after his eldest daughter. To pay homage to the character of Leslie, a fan based website created an 8" action figure in Paskey's likeness.

Paskey credits the longevity of his character to his sense of caution. Since he was on the set most of the time and knew the script well, he made sure that he was always elsewhere when an episode called for someone to die.
When his character does die in the episode "Obsession," Paskey explains his mysterious return in the next episode by describing a lost scene in the script, where Dr. McCoy administered a miracle potion that saves Leslie's life. Paskey mentioned that this scene was never filmed. Episode director Ralph Senesky also confirmed that he did not film it.

In "This Side of Paradise" his is the only character to mutiny openly against his superior, Captain Kirk, and even disobeys orders again in "And the Children Shall Lead," although under an alien influence. In "The City on the Edge of Forever," Paskey was the driver of the truck in the scene where character Edith Keeler (Joan Collins) is struck down and killed.

Paskey also  appeared occasionally as a stand-in for Shatner in certain long scenes. He was the hand-double for James Doohan, who was missing a finger, in "Wolf in the Fold" and "That Which Survives." He appeared in most of the episodes from the first two seasons of the original series. A bad back and cluster headaches from an old injury, which worsened from the set lighting, led to his leaving the show in the third season. Paskey admitted in a July 1988 Starlog Magazine interview that once the pain had gone, he tried to return to acting but had lost many of his Hollywood contacts while working on Star Trek, and eventually retired from the profession.

Appearances

Deep Space Nine

Star Trek: New Voyages 

In 2004, he appeared in the Star Trek: New Voyages episode "Come What May" as Admiral Leslie, a character established as Lieutenant Leslie's father.

Later years 
After retiring from acting, Paskey went into business for himself in Santa Ana, California, owning and operating an auto-detailing service called The Air Shop with his wife Judy. He sold the business in 2004. He and his wife were members of Hot Rods Unlimited, a Southern California auto club. They have four children.

Paskey admitted that he considered auditioning for Star Trek: The Motion Picture (1979) but later reconsidered. He remained a fan of the film series but not the television follow-up Star Trek: The Next Generation, as he explained that "he went to sleep on it".

Paskey died on August 17, 2021, three days before his 82nd birthday.

References

External links
 

1939 births
2021 deaths
American male television actors
Male actors from Delaware